The Information and Communication Technology Division, abbreviated to ICT- Division, is a department of the Ministry of Posts, Telecommunications and Information Technology of the executive branch of the Government of Bangladesh.

Units
The following units function under the ICT Division:
Bangladesh Hi-Tech Park
ICT Directorate
Bangladesh Computer Council
Controller of Certifying Authority

References

External links 
 Information and Communication Technology Division

Posts, Telecommunications and Information Technology
Information technology in Bangladesh
Electronics industry in Bangladesh